Ctislav Doseděl was the defending champion but did not compete that year.

Hernán Gumy won in the final 6–4, 7–5 against Marcelo Ríos.

Seeds

  Marcelo Ríos (final)
  Félix Mantilla (semifinals)
  Alberto Berasategui (semifinals)
  Hernán Gumy (champion)
  Marcelo Filippini (quarterfinals)
  Galo Blanco (second round)
  Fernando Meligeni (quarterfinals)
  Nicolas Pereira (first round)

Draw

Finals

Top half

Bottom half

External links
 Singles draw

1996
1996 ATP Tour